Meredith Township (also designated Township 11) is one of twenty townships within Wake County, North Carolina, United States. As of the 2010 census, Meredith Township had a population of 13,926, a 21.2% increase over 2000.

Meredith Township, occupying  in central Wake County, is almost completely occupied by portions of the city of Raleigh.

References

Townships in Wake County, North Carolina
Townships in North Carolina